

Relevant Italian violin-makers based in Emilia-Romagna 

Franco Albanelli (Bologna 1933-2007)
Otello Bignami (Bologna 1914-1989)
Marino Capicchioni (San Marino, 1895 - Rimini, 1977)
Carlo Carletti (Pieve di Cento 1873-1941)
Natale Carletti (Pieve di Cento 1904-1979)
Giovanni Cavani (Spilamberto 1851-1936)
Giuseppe Fiorini (Bazzano - Bologna 1861-1934)
Raffaele Fiorini (Musiano di Pian di Macina, Pianoro - Bologna 1828-1898)
Arturo Fracassi (Cesena 1899-1973)
Orsolo Gotti (Pieve di Cento 1867-1922)
Giovanni Battista Guadagnini (Bilegno - Piacenza 1711-1786)
Gian Carlo Guicciardi (Spilamberto, Modena 1940-)
Floriano Guidanti (Bologna ca. 1643-1715)
Giovanni Guidanti (Bologna 1687-1760)
Giuseppe Lepri (Santarcangelo - 1896-1976)
Mario Maccaferri (Cento 1900-1993)
Folgenzio Malagoli (Modena 1850-1892)
Custode Marcucci (Lugo 1865-1951)
Giovanni Marchi (Bologna 1727-1807)
Nicolò Marchioni (Don Nicola Amati) (Bologna ca. 1643-1715)
Pietro Messori (Modena 1870–1952)
Luigi Mingazzi (Ravenna 1859-1933)
Armando Monterumici (Vedrana di Budrio - Bologna 1875-1936)
Paolo Morara (Bologna 1889-1958)
Luigi Mozzani (Faenza, Bologna, Cento 1869-1943)
Ansaldo Poggi (Villafontana di Medicina - Bologna 1893-1984)
Augusto Pollastri (Bologna 1877-1927)
Cesare Pollastri (Bologna 1925-1998)
Gaetano Pollastri (Bologna 1886-1960)
Roberto Regazzi (Bologna 1956-)
Sesto Rocchi (Reggio Emilia 1909-1991)
Elisa Scrollavezza
Renato Scrollavezza (Castelnuovo Fogliano - Parma 1927-)
Gaetano Sgarabotto (Vicenza - Parma 1878-1959)
Pietro Sgarabotto (Milano - Parma 1903–1990)
Giuseppe Sgarbi (Finale Emilia 1818-1905)
Ettore Soffritti (Ferrara 1877–1928)
Luigi Soffritti (Ferrara 1860–1996)
Maurizio Spignoli (Bagno di Romagna 1958 - Bologna 2007)
Nicola Utili (Castelbolognese 1888-1948)
Carlo Annibale Tononi (Bologna 1675-1730)
Giovanni Tononi (Bologna ca. 1640-1713)
Raffaele Vaccari (Lentigione 1908-1994)
Andrea Zanrè
Aldo Capelli (Cervia-Cesena 1923-2008)
.....

More documents by City

Bibliography

Sandro Pasqual, Roberto Regazzi, Lutherie in Bologna (1998).
Rosengard, Duane Giovanni Battista Guadagnini, The life and achievement of a master maker of violins (2000).
Versari Artemio, Modern Violin Making in the Emilia-Romagna Region (2002).
The Sound of Bologna (2002).

Italian luthiers
People from Emilia-Romagna